Stará Lesná or "Old Forest" (German: Alt Walddorf) is a village and municipality in Kežmarok District in the Prešov Region in north-central Slovakia. Stará Lesná is located in an area traditionally known as Spiš and it is situated within the Slovak Tourism Region of the Tatras.

History
The tourism region of the Tatras encompasses today the northern half (except for a tiny tip lying in Poland) of what used to be Scepusium or Szepes County. It was a part of the Kingdom of Hungary from the creation of the county in the second half of the 12th century to 1918 when Austria-Hungary ceased to exist and Czechoslovakia was created. This northern borderland was never really inhabited by Hungarians, but up until the last world war there was a substantial population of Carpathian Germans in Spiš or "Zips", where they began to arrive in the mid-12th century.

Stará Lesná was mentioned for the first time in 1294. The village was founded by the Berzeviczys, a family whose forefather Rutkér of Mátray (Matrei), an ispán, arrived to Spiš County from Tyrol in the beginning of the 13th century. The village belonged to a German language island. The German population was expelled in 1945.

Geography
The population of Stará Lesná is about 940.

The municipality lies at an elevation of 736 metres and covers an area of 9.482 km². To the north, Stará Lesná is bordered by the town of Vysoké Tatry and Tatra National Park.

Line no. 184 of the Tatra Electric Railway connects Stará Lesná with Tatranská Lomnica and Starý Smokovec; the latter is connected to Štrbské Pleso and Poprad by line no. 183.

Sights
Selected sights and locations within ~an hour's drive away (distances in kilometers):

the Roman Catholic church in Stará Lesná (13th century, rebuilt in the 18th century, belfry ca. 1600) | TANAP Museum, Tatra Nature Exposition (botanical garden) and cable way to Lomnický Peak in Tatranská Lomnica 5 | Gerlachov, highest Carpathian peak at 2 655 m | Starý Smokovec 8½ and 13 other settlements of the Town of High Tatras | Belianska Cave 15 in the White Tatras | Castle of Kežmarok, Wooden Articular Church in Kežmarok (part of a World Heritage Site, WHS) in Kežmarok 12 | AquaCity, Sub-Tatran Museum and Tatras Gallery in Poprad 12; Spišská Sobota (suburb) 12; Poprad-Tatry Airport 17 | Dom Ždiar (Goral museum) in Ždiar 22 | Strážky Manor House in Spišská Belá 23 | Štrbské Pleso 24 | entrances to Slovak Paradise National Park in Čingov 33 (near Smižany) and Podlesok 33 (near Betlanovce), Tomášov Viewpoint 33 (two km on foot from Spišské Tomášovce) and Dobšiná Ice Cave (part of a WHS) 45 | Museum of Spiš Territory in Spišská Nová Ves 35 | Lysá Poľana (SK) 36 ╪ Łysa Polana (PL) 37 | Levoča, Spiš Castle and the Associated Cultural Monuments (WHS); Levoča 36, Spiš Castle 53, Spišské Podhradie 50, Spišská Kapitula 50 and Žehra 55; in Levoča St. James's Cathedral (Majster Pavol's altar) and Spiš Museum | Markušovce Manor House and Dardanely (garden house) 44 | Castle of Stará Ľubovňa and Skanzen (open-air traditional buildings' museum) 50 | Spišská Stará Ves (center of Zamagurie) 51 | Red Monastery and start of Dunajec rafting in Červený Kláštor 57 in the Pieniny National Park | Niedzica Castle (PL) 57 | Zakopane (PL) 58 | Liptovský Mikuláš 68 | Demänovská Cave of Liberty 81 | Jasná (largest ski resort in the country) 82 in the Low Tatras.

Further away: Prešov 89 | Bardejov (WHS) 104 | Orava Castle 115 | Košice 127 | Kraków (PL) 149 | Budapest (HU) 323 | Bratislava 355 | Prague (CZ) 569.

References

External links
 Official website of the municipality of Stará Lesná
 Weather forecast for Stará Lesná
 Public transport in Poprad & High Tatras
 Tourist website of Spiš
 High Tatras portal
 "Tatry - mysterium" clip (YouTube)
 Tatra National Park (TANAP), Slovakia
 Pieniny National Park (PIENAP), Slovakia 
 Slovak Paradise National Park
 Low Tatras National Park (NAPANT)
 World Heritage in Slovakia

Villages and municipalities in Kežmarok District